Lake Holcombe is also a popular name for the Holcombe Flowage.

Lake Holcombe is a town in Chippewa County in the U.S. state of Wisconsin. Its population was 1,031 at the 2010 census. The census-designated place of Holcombe is located in the town.

History

The area that would become Holcombe was first surveyed in 1852 by crews working for the U.S. government. One crew marked all the section corners of the township, walking through the woods and wading the rivers, measuring with chain and compass. When done, the deputy surveyor filed this general description:
This Township contains a few(?) small Cedar & Tamarac Swamp, All unfit for cultivation. The surface is generally level, soil second rate and most of (?) fit for cultivation. The Township is covered with timber mostly Pine, Hemlock, Tamarac, Cedar and some Sugar Birch and Maple. The Chippewa River runs in a southerly direction through the west part of the Township and Fisher River runs through the South East part Both of the streams have a rapid current and furnish good motive power for Mills.

Originally called Little Falls in the 1870s, the community was established by the Union Lumbering Company along the Chippewa River and came to be known as Holcombe years later.

The original Little Falls dam was built in 1878 by Elijah Swift and Joseph Viles for the Chippewa River Improvement and Log Driving Company. Its main aim was to provide reliable water for floating logs downstream, even when natural water levels were low. Parts of the dam were washed out by floods in 1880 and 1884. After the second washout, a dam-building specialist named Billy "the Beaver" England was brought in. He and his crew rebuilt the dam in the winter of 1884–1885, and it survived the floods for many years after. The journal of the dam's keeper from 1882 to 1890 still survives, briefly describing log drives and jams and the flood of 1884. A terrible accident occurred in 1905, when eleven log drivers drowned trying to get to a log jam near the dam. The dam functioned until 1910, when logging operations ceased. It washed out in the 1920s.

The current hydroelectric dam was built in 1950 by the Wisconsin-Minnesota Light and Power Company, producing the current Holcombe Flowage. The flowage is a popular recreation area, and the shores are thick with homes and cottages.

Geography
The Holcombe Flowage ("Lake Holcombe") takes up the northern part of the town's western boundary, impounding the Chippewa River itself but also extending east across the northern part of the town where the Jump River enters.

Demographics

As of the census of 2000, there were 1,010 people, 413 households, and 292 families residing in the town. The population density was 37.5 people per square mile (14.5/km2).  There were 548 housing units at an average density of 20.4 per square mile (7.9/km2). The racial makeup of the town was 98.71% White, 0.50% Native American, 0.40% Asian, 0.10% from other races, and 0.30% from two or more races. Hispanic or Latino of any race were 0.79% of the population.

There were 413 households, out of which 26.9% had children under the age of 18 living with them, 61.0% were married couples living together, 6.3% had a female householder with no husband present, and 29.1% were non-families. 24.5% of all households were made up of individuals, and 10.7% h ad someone living alone who was 65 years of age or older. The average household size was 2.40 and the average family size was 2.80.

In the town, the population was spread out, with 23.8% under the age of 18, 5.3% from 18 to 24, 23.7% from 25 to 44, 30.2% from 45 to 64, and 17.0% who were 65 years of age or older. The median age was 43 years. For every 100 females, there were 98.8 males. For every 100 females age 18 and over, there were 99.0 males.

The median income for a household in the town was $33,083, and the median income for a family was $37,500. Males had a median income of $26,905 versus $18,750 for females. The per capita income for the town was $15,900. About 5.5% of families and 10.2% of the population were below the poverty line, including 10.6% of those under age 18 and 9.1% of those age 65 or over.

References

Further reading
"Little Falls Dam", a section in Malcolm Rosholt's Lumbermen on the Chippewa beginning at page 179, includes descriptions and photos of the dam and photos of residents from way back.

External links
Lake Holcombe Resort and Business Association

Towns in Chippewa County, Wisconsin
Eau Claire–Chippewa Falls metropolitan area
Towns in Wisconsin